In American football, passing, along with running (also referred to as rushing), is one of the two main methods of advancing the ball down the field. Passes are typically attempted by the quarterback, but any offensive player can attempt a pass provided they are behind the line of scrimmage. To qualify as a passing play, the ball must have initially moved forward after leaving the hands of the passer; if the ball initially moved laterally or backwards, the play would instead be considered a running play. The act of catching a forward pass is a reception. The number of receptions each player makes is a recorded statistic in football games. In addition to the overall National Football League (NFL) receiving champion, league record books recognize statistics from the American Football League (AFL), which operated from 1960 to 1969 before being absorbed into the NFL in 1970, Although league record books do not recognize statistics from the All-America Football Conference, another league that merged with the NFL, these statistics are recognized by the Pro Football Hall of Fame.

The NFL did not begin keeping official records until the 1932 season. The total receptions of the leader has increased over time due to the increase of the number of games within an NFL season as well as the increase in the prevalence of passing in the NFL. Don Hutson led the league in receptions a record eight times. The first NFL player to record over 100 receptions in a season was Art Monk in 1984; Lionel Taylor and Charlie Hennigan had accomplished the feat in the AFL in 1961 and 1964 respectively. The NFL record for single season receptions has changed on 15 occasions, with Michael Thomas holding the current record of 149 receptions set in 2019.

List of NFL annual receptions leaders

Through  season

As per The Football Database and Pro Football Reference.

AFL reception leaders

As per Pro Football Reference.

See also
 List of National Football League career receptions leaders

References

Receptions leaders
National Football League lists